Bonagee United Football Club is a football club from Ireland currently competing in the Ulster Senior League. The club are based in Letterkenny. Bonagee United play their home games at Dry Arch Park. The club hosts a number of teams at different age ranges.

History
Bonagee United were formed on 2 November 1970 in the Continental Bar, now called Voodoo, on Letterkenny's Main Street. In 1971, the club purchased 1 hectare (2.5 acres) of land behind the Dry Arch for £1000. They were originally known as Arcade Athletic. In 1973, Athletic became Bonagee Celtic and then in 1975 Bonagee United. A development programme was drawn up in 1998 and gave the club an all-weather playing pitch and a spectator stand. A general purpose hall, two AstroTurf pitches with floodlights, extra dressing rooms, a store and office have also been added. Today the facilities amount to €973,000, for which they received a grant of €360,000. Money was raised by generous locals and the then Minister for Sport, Jim McDaid.

The club won their first Ulster Senior League Division One  title in 2009.

Famous lawsuit
On 3 October 1993 former Bonagee footballer Dessie Larkin incurred severe burns to his scrotum as he rubbed it over the lime used to mark the football pitch. 13 years later Larkin sued the Football Association of Ireland. Bonagee were participating in the FAI Junior Cup at the time. Larkin recalled how there was no changing or showering facilities available and when he removed his football shorts, he noticed some form of "white stuff" on the interior of his shorts and his skin was also inflamed and falling off.  The judge was told that there were no instructions from the FAI as to the amount of lime and water that should have been in the mix. The judge awarded Larkin €9000 and stated that the onus was on the FAI to ensure that players be warned to take precautions to prevent the incident from happening.

FAI Cup v Shelbourne
Damien Duff was manager for the game in Letterkenny.

References

1970 establishments in Ireland
Association football clubs established in 1970
Association football clubs in County Donegal
Organisations based in Letterkenny
Sport in Letterkenny
Ulster Senior League (association football) teams